Brocket is a city in Ramsey County, North Dakota, United States. The population was 34 at the 2020 census. Brocket was founded in 1901.

Geography
Brocket is located at  (48.212499, -98.353942).

Demographics

2010 census
As of the census of 2010, there were 57 people, 25 households, and 17 families residing in the city. The racial makeup of the city was 100.0% White.

There were 25 households, of which 24.0% had children under the age of 18 living with them, 60.0% were married couples living together, 4.0% had a female householder with no husband present, 4.0% had a male householder with no wife present, and 32.0% were non-families. 28.0% of all households were made up of individuals, and 20% had someone living alone who was 65 years of age or older. The average household size was 2.28 and the average family size was 2.82.

The median age in the city was 50.5 years. 21.1% of residents were under the age of 18; 5.3% were between the ages of 18 and 24; 14.1% were from 25 to 44; 33.4% were from 45 to 64; and 26.3% were 65 years of age or older. The gender makeup of the city was 57.9% male and 42.1% female.

2000 census
As per the census of 2000, there were 65 people, 26 households, and 15 families residing in the city. The population density was 65 people per square mile (32.2/km2). There were 35 housing units at an average density of 44.6 per square mile (17.3/km2). The racial makeup of the city was 99% White and 1% Asian.

There were 26 households, out of which 30.8% had children under the age of 18 living with them, 50.0% were married couples living together, 7.7% had a female householder with no husband present, and 42.3% were non-families. 38.5% of all households were made up of individuals, and 15.4% had someone living alone who was 65 years of age or older. The average household size was 2.50 and the average family size was 3.27.

In the city, the population was spread out, with 33.8% under the age of 18, 1.5% from 18 to 24, 27.7% from 25 to 44, 15.4% from 45 to 64, and 21.5% who were 65 years of age or older. The median age was 36 years. For every 100 females, there were 116.7 males. For every 100 females age 18 and over, there were 126.3 males.

The median income for a household in the city was $55,000, and the median income for a family was $171,000. Males had a median income of $20,000 versus $151,000 for females. The per capita income for the city was $101,000. There were no families and 0% of the population living below the poverty line, including no under eighteens and none of those over 64.

References

External links
Brocket diamond jubilee, 1900-1975 : July 5 & 6, 1975, Brocket, North Dakota from the Digital Horizons website

Cities in North Dakota
Cities in Ramsey County, North Dakota
Populated places established in 1901
1901 establishments in North Dakota